The South Central Library System (SCLS) is a consortium of 53 public libraries in 7 Wisconsin counties: Adams, Columbia, Dane, Green, Portage, Sauk, and Wood.

The mission of the South Central Library System is " to help its member libraries provide the best possible service to the public."

Members 
SCLS serves libraries in these communities, as well as the Dane County Library Service:
 Adams County
 Albany
 Amherst
 Arpin
 Baraboo
 Belleville
 Black Earth
 Brodhead
 Cambria
 Cambridge
 Columbus
 Cross Plains
 Deerfield
 DeForest - DeForest Area Public Library
 Fitchburg
 LaValle
 Lodi
 Madison (Central Library & 8 branches)
 Marshall
 Marshfield
 Mazomanie
 McFarland
 Middleton
 Monona
 Monroe
 Monticello
 Mount Horeb
 Nekoosa
 New Glarus
 North Freedom
 Oregon
 Pardeeville
 Pittsville
 Plain
 Portage
 Poynette
 Prairie du Sac
 Reedsburg
 Rio
 Rock Springs
 Rome
 Sauk City
 Spring Green
 Stevens Point-Portage County (Central Library & 3 branches) 
 Stoughton
 Sun Prairie
 Verona
 Vesper
 Waunakee
 Wisconsin Dells
 Wisconsin Rapids
 Wyocena

References

External links
 

Education in Adams County, Wisconsin
Education in Columbia County, Wisconsin
Education in Dane County, Wisconsin
Education in Green County, Wisconsin
Education in Portage County, Wisconsin
Education in Sauk County, Wisconsin
Education in Wood County, Wisconsin
Library consortia in Wisconsin